Ealdwulf (died 6 May 1002) was a medieval Abbot of Peterborough, Bishop of Worcester, and Archbishop of York.

Life

Traditional stories state that Ealdwulf was a layman and chancellor to King Edgar of England when one night he accidentally smothered his son while sharing a bed with the child. Rather than go to Rome to seek absolution for this sin, which had been his original plan, Ealdwulf refounded the monastery at Medeshamstede, which later became known as Peterborough Abbey, on the advice of Æthelwold, bishop of Winchester. Ealdwulf then joined his new foundation as a monk before becoming abbot of Peterborough from about 966 to 992.

Ealdwulf was bishop of Worcester as well as archbishop of York from 995 to his death on 6 May 1002. While archbishop, he held a synod at Worcester around 1000 to consider moving the relics of Saint Oswald of Worcester.

Ealdwulf's reputation was one of extreme piety. William of Malmesbury compared him to his successor Wulfstan as follows "Ealdwulf can be pardoned for holding the two sees contrary to canon law because of his sanctity, and because he did it not through ambition but by necessity."

Citations

References

External links
 

1002 deaths
Abbots of Peterborough
Archbishops of York
Bishops of Worcester
10th-century English archbishops
Year of birth unknown